FNB may refer to:

Financial institutions 
 Farmers National Bank (disambiguation)
 First National Bank (disambiguation)
 First Nations Bank of Canada
 First Niagara Bank, an American bank
 Florida National Bank, an American bank
 FNB Corporation, an American financial services corporation
 FNB United Corp., an American bank holding company

Transport 
 Brenner Field, in Nebraska, United States
 Farnborough (Main) railway station, in England
 Ferrotramviaria, an Italian rail operator managing the Ferrovie del Nord Barese network
 Neubrandenburg Airport, in Mecklenburg-Vorpommern, Germany

Other uses 
 Benin Navy
 Food Not Bombs, an anti-hunger activist group
 Fox Business Network, an American financial news network
 Friday Night Baseball on Apple TV+, a baseball broadcast by Apple Inc.
 The Friday Night Boys, an American rock band
 New Belgian Front, a Belgian political party

 People's Action No to More Road Tolls, a Norwegian political party

 Suomen Tietotoimisto, a Finnish news agency
 FNB Stadium, a South African soccer stadium
 4 Non Blondes, an American pop rock band